Anushay Hossain is a Bangladeshi American author and analyst. She was born and raised in Dhaka, Bangladesh where she lived before moving to America for college.

Life and career
Hossain graduated from the University of Virginia (UVA) and completed her MA in Gender and Development at the University of Sussex.

She began her career at the Feminist Majority Foundation working on their Nobel Peace Prize-nominated Campaign for Afghan Women. After completing her master's degree, Hossain spent a year at the United Nations Development Fund for Women's (UNIFEM UK) London office, before returning to Washington, DC.

In 2013, Hossain left the Feminist Majority to go full-time with her writing. She primarily writes about politics, gender, and women's health in her articles and her work has been published on CNN, Forbes, USA Today, and Newsweek.

She is also the managing director of The Daily Ittefaq, which was founded by her paternal grandfather, Tofazzal Hossain Manik Miah. Anushay also writes a column for the paper.

Hossain is a regular on-air guest at CNN, MSNBC, and PBS and went viral debating toxic masculinity with notorious cable news anchor and personality, Tucker Carlson in 2018 on Fox News. She also guest-hosted Al-Jazeera English's (AJE) show, The Stream, from 2012 to 2013.

In 2020, Hossain was signed by American publishing company, Simon and Schuster. Her first book for them was released in October 2021 and was excerpted in Vogue.

Hossain is also the host of the Spilling Chai podcast which is now in its fifth season.

Personal life
Hossain lives in Washington, D.C. with her husband and their two young daughters. Her husband, Shy Pahlevani, is a D.C.-based serial entrepreneur. In 2017, Pahlevani started the food-tech platform HUNGRY — the first-ever online marketplace connecting local top chefs with businesses.

References

People from Dhaka
Living people
Feminist bloggers
CNN people
Year of birth missing (living people)